The Las Lomitas Elementary School District is a public school district in the San Francisco Bay Area, primarily serving parts of the communities of Menlo Park, Atherton and Ladera, with its headquarters in Menlo Park. Under the current arrangement, all students in the district attend Las Lomitas Elementary School starting before Kindergarten through 3rd grade, and attend La Entrada Middle School for 4th through 8th grade. Students from this school district who continue on with public schooling matriculate to the  Sequoia Union High School District, most attending Menlo-Atherton High School, though some students opt to attend Woodside High School, which is closer to home for some students. Several LLESD schools have won the prestigious Blue Ribbon Award.

The district also owns the former La Loma School campus adjacent to La Entrada, currently rented to Phillips Brooks Academy, and the former Ladera School campus, currently rented to Woodland School, both private schools.

District History 
The district was formed in 1904, after the nearby Searsville school on Sand Hill Road closed in 1894. The first year of school was in session from October 3, 1904 to June 16, 1905, with average attendance of 21 students, and total budget of $1,735.  The following school year stated June 30th, after only a two week summer break. Various discussions were held in the 1960s and 1970s about merging the district with nearby Menlo Park, but these were never finalized. Business services were shared with the Menlo Park City School District from 1978 to 2004.

District Name 
Los Lomitas means little hills in Spanish, and refers to the small hills through the district.

Schools
Elementary School
 Las Lomitas Elementary (K-3) - 485 students

Middle School
 La Entrada (4-8) - 745 students

References

External links

 
 Las Lomitas Education Foundation website

School districts in San Mateo County, California
Menlo Park, California